The following is a timeline of the history of the city of Exeter, Devon, England.

Prior to 16th century

 250 BC – Goods traded with Roman coins 
 45 CE – Romans in power (approximate date).
 55 – Roman fort established in Isca Dumnoniorum (approximate date).
 380 – Roman occupation ends (approximate date).
 600 – Saxons arrive (approximate date).
 868 – Monastery founded by Ethelred.
 876 – Danes occupy town.
 893 – Town besieged by Danes again.
 900 – Market active.
 927 – Athelstan evicts the Cornish from Exeter (and perhaps the rest of Devon), according to William of Malmesbury, writing around 1120.
 932 – Monastery founded by Athelstan.
 1003 – Exeter sacked by forces of Sweyn of Denmark.
 1048 – Episcopal see relocated to Exeter from Crediton.
 1050 – Leofric becomes bishop of Exeter.
 1067 – Exeter besieged by forces of William the Conqueror.
 1068 – Rougemont Castle built (approximate date).
 1087 – Benedictine Priory of St Nicholas founded.
 1130 – Exeter fair active.
 1136 – Exeter besieged by forces of Stephen, King of England.
 1190 - Old Exe Bridge construction began.
 1207 – Mayor in office.
 1214 - Old Exe Bridge construction finished (approximate).
 1236 – Nunnery founded.
 1400 – Exeter Cathedral built (approximate date).
 1466 - Tailors’ trade gild incorporated.
 1468/70 - Exeter Guildhall current building constructed.
 1482 - Tailors’ trade gild dissolved on the petition of the burgesses.
 1490 – Company of Weavers and Fullers incorporated.
 1497 – City besieged by forces of Perkin Warbeck.

16th–18th centuries

 1536
 City becomes a county corporate.
 Monastery disbanded.
 1556 – Society of Merchant Adventurers incorporated.
 1564 – Exeter Ship Canal construction begins.
 1593 – Guildhall rebuilt.
 1595 – Michael Harte bookseller in business.
 1612 – Northernhay Gardens laid out.
 1633 – Exeter Free Grammar School opens.
 1643 – September: City taken by forces of Charles I of England.
 1646 – April: Parliamentarians in power.
 1664 – St Stephen's Church built.
 1681 – Custom House built on the Quay.
 1688 – November: William III of England visits city.
 1696 – Mint established.
 1714 – Exeter Mercury newspaper begins publication.
 1743 – Royal Devon and Exeter Hospital opened.
 1760 – George's Meeting (Unitarian) built.
 1763 – Trewman's Exeter Flying Post newspaper in publication.
 1764 – Exeter Synagogue consecrated.
 1778 – Bridge rebuilt.
 1783 – Gilbert Dyer's circulating library in business.
 1792 – Exeter Gazette newspaper begins publication.

19th century

 1813
 Devon and Exeter Institution founded.
 Exeter Western Luminary begins publication.
 1814
 Iron Footbridge built.
 Exeter Medical Library founded.
 1821 – Besley's Exeter News begins publication.
 1823 – Cholera epidemic.
 1825
 Mechanics' Institution opens.
 Chichester Place laid out.
 1832 – Veitch plant nursery in business.
 1835 – Athenaeum instituted.
 1837 – Catacombs built.
 1840 – Exeter Diocesan Training College opens.
 1842 – Church of St Andrew built.
 1844 – Bristol and Exeter Railway begins operating to Exeter St Davids railway station.
 1847 – Polytechnic Institution founded.
 1848 – South Devon Railway begins operating from Exeter St Davids station.
 1852 - Exeter and South Devon Volunteers formed.
 1853 – Prison built.
 1854 – School of Art founded.
 1860 – London and South Western Railway begins operating to Exeter Queen Street station.
 1862 – Devonshire Association for the Advancement of Science, Literature, and Art established.
 1867 – November: Economic unrest.
 1870 – Royal Albert Memorial Museum established.
 1882 – Horse-drawn tram begins operating.
 1884 – 18 November: Sacred Heart Church opened.
 1887 – 5 September: Theatre Royal burns down with 186 fatalities.
 1889
 Theatre Royal rebuilt.
 Devon and Exeter Medico-Chirurgical Society founded.
 1896 – City of Exeter Electricity Company formed.

20th century

 1901 – Population: 47,185.
 1904 – Express & Echo newspaper begins publication.
 1905
 29 March: Rebuilt Exe Bridge opened.
 4 April: Exeter Corporation Tramways begins operating its electric system.
 Approximate date: Devon and Cornwall Record Society established.
 1907 – Sidwell Street Methodist Church completed, a pioneering example of reinforced concrete construction by French engineer Paul Cottancin.
 1910 – Empire Electric Palace opens.
 1911 – Exeter Pictorial Record Society active.
 1914 – 7 October: First of five war emergency hospitals in requisitioned buildings in the city opens to casualties, staffed by Voluntary Aid Detachment nurses.
 1916 – December: Deller's Café opens in Bedford Street.
 1937
 Odeon Exeter cinema opens.
 Exeter Airport opens.
 1942 – May: "Baedeker Blitz": Aerial bombing by the German Luftwaffe devastates the city centre.
 1949 – 21 October: Official inauguration of construction of Princesshay, Britain's first pedestrianised shopping precinct, as part of the postwar city centre reconstruction.
 1955 – University of Exeter chartered.
 1960 – October: Flood.
 1963 – November: Exeter & Devon Crematorium opened.
 1964 – Devon County Hall built.
 1967 – Northcott Theatre opens.
 1970 – Exeter College established.
 1972 – Barnfield Theatre established.
 1974 – Spacex (art gallery) established.
 1977 – M5 motorway opens.
 1997 – Douglas Centre for the History of Cinema and Popular Culture opens at University of Exeter.

21st century

 2007 – Princesshay rebuilt.
 2008 – 22 May: Attempted bombing in Princesshay.
 2011 – Population: 117,773.
 2017 – Exeter Chiefs rugby union team win the Aviva Premiership.
 2021 - World War II bomb detonation.

See also
 Exeter history
 Timelines of other cities in South West England: Bath, Bristol, Plymouth

References

Bibliography

Published in 17th–18th centuries

Published in 19th century

1800s–1840s

1850s–1890s

Published in 20th century 
 
 
 
 
 
 
 
 
 W. G. Hoskins. Industry, Trade and People in Exeter, 1688–1800 (1935)
 
 W. G. Hoskins. Exeter" History Today (May 1951), Vol. 1 Issue 5, p28-37 online.
 Aileen Fox. Roman Exeter (1952)
 

 Published in 21st century 
 
 Tim Isaac and Chris Hallam Secret Exeter'' (2018)

External links

 
 . Includes digitised directories of Exeter, various dates
 
 Digital Public Library of America. Works related to Exeter, various dates

Years in England
 
exeter
Exeter-related lists
Exeter